Peter Paetzold (16 March 1935 in Plau, Mecklenburg) is a German chemist and emeritus professor of inorganic chemistry at RWTH Aachen University.

Life 
He studied at the Ludwig Maximilian University of Munich. In 1961, he received his doctorate in the working group of Egon Wiberg; in his dissertation he dealt with the thermal decomposition of borazides. After his habilitation (1966), he taught for two more years at the LMU. He then moved to a chair of Inorganic Chemistry at RWTH Aachen University. In his research, he mainly dealt with the molecular chemistry of the element boron, especially with iminoboranes and cluster compounds. His list of publications includes about 180 papers. Paetzold retired in 2000. After various books and textbooks on chemistry, he published a textbook on general chemistry in autumn 2009. In 2015, a scientific colloquium in his honor took place.
He is married and has 4 children.

Awards 
1998 Alfred Stock Memorial Prize

Selected publications 
Paetzold, P.: Chemie – Eine Einführung, Walter de Gruyter Berlin und New York, 2009,

References 

Living people
1935 births
20th-century German chemists
Academic staff of RWTH Aachen University